ArtHeart Community Art Centre or simply ArtHeart is an organization from Regent Park that seeks to "provide an open, supportive environment that uses the arts to foster creative thinking, self-reliance and entrepreneurship." In 2016, ArtHeart was part of a creative partnership with the Textile Museum of Canada and four other local arts agencies to use rug-making to encourage creative expression and teach new skills to people in at-risk or underserved communities.

References

External links 
 http://www.artheart.ca/

Regent Park